Geoffrey Dee (born November 10, 1995) is an American soccer player.

Early life

College and youth
Dee played four years of college soccer, starting at the University of Tulsa for two years, before transferring to the University of Louisville in 2016, which included a redshirted 2017 season.

Dee appeared for an array of USL PDL clubs during his time at college, including spells at Portland Timbers U23s, OKC Energy U23, FC Tucson, and Cincinnati Dutch Lions.

Club career

Louisville City
On March 6, 2019, Dee signed for USL Championship side Louisville City FC.

References

External links
 
 USL bio
 Geoffrey Dee - Men's Soccer Tulsa bio
 Geoffrey Dee - Men's Soccer Louisville bio

1995 births
Living people
American soccer players
Tulsa Golden Hurricane men's soccer players
Louisville Cardinals men's soccer players
Portland Timbers U23s players
OKC Energy FC players
FC Tucson players
Cincinnati Dutch Lions players
Louisville City FC players
Association football midfielders
Soccer players from Tennessee
USL League Two players
USL Championship players